Swimming is one of the sports at the biennial Universiade competition. It has been one of the event's competed sports since the inaugural edition. It was not included in 1975 and 1989.

Editions

Medal table 
Last updated after the 2019 Summer Universiade

See also
List of Universiade records in swimming

External links
2009 Belgrade Official website

 
Sports at the Summer Universiade
Universiade